The Second Bruce ministry (Nationalist–Country Coalition) was the 17th ministry of the Government of Australia. It was led by the country's 8th Prime Minister, Stanley Bruce. The Second Bruce ministry succeeded the First Bruce ministry, which dissolved on 18 December 1925 following the federal election that took place in November. The ministry was replaced by the Third Bruce ministry on 29 November 1928 following the 1928 federal election.

Stanley Bruce, who died in 1967, was the last surviving member of the Second Bruce ministry; Bruce was also the last surviving member of the Fifth Hughes ministry and the First Bruce ministry. Earle Page was the last surviving Country minister.

Ministry

References

Ministries of George V
Bruce, 2
1925 establishments in Australia
1928 disestablishments in Australia
Cabinets established in 1925
Cabinets disestablished in 1928